Theodore Weesner (July 31, 1935 – June 25, 2015) was an American author. Born in Flint, Michigan, he is best known for his coming-of-age debut novel, The Car Thief (1972).  The book, published by  Random House, is in 439 libraries, according to WorldCat

He also wrote The True Detective (1987), Novemberfest (1994), Harbor Lights (2000), and other novels and short stories

Published works 
Novels
 The Car Thief (1972)
 A German Affair (1976)
 The True Detective (1987)
 Winning the City (1990)
 Novemberfest (1994)
 Harbor Lights (2000)
 Carrying (2015)

Story collections
 Children's Hearts (1992)

References

1935 births
2015 deaths
20th-century American novelists
Writers from Flint, Michigan
20th-century American short story writers
Novelists from Michigan